Gloucester County was one of the original Nineteen Counties in New South Wales, and is now one of the 141 cadastral divisions of New South Wales.  It includes the area around Port Stephens. It is bounded on the north and west by the Manning River, and on the south-west by the Williams River.

Overview 
Gloucester County was named after County Gloucester, England.

Parishes within this county
A full list of parishes found within this county, their current LGA and mapping coordinates to the approximate centre of each location is as follows:

References

External links 
 Department of Lands - Parish Map Preservation Project

Counties of New South Wales